Mount Hassel is a rock peak  high, the northeasternmost summit of the massif at the head of Amundsen Glacier, in the Queen Maud Mountains of Antarctica. In November 1911, a number of mountain peaks in this general vicinity were observed and rudely positioned by the South Pole Party under Roald Amundsen. Amundsen named one of them for Sverre Hassel, a member of the party. The peak described was mapped by the United States Geological Survey from surveys and U.S. Navy aerial photography, 1960–64. For the sake of historical continuity and to commemorate the Norwegian exploration in this area, the Advisory Committee on Antarctic Names has selected this feature to be designated Mount Hassel. Other peaks in the massif have also been named for members of Amundsen's South Pole Party.

References

Mountains of the Ross Dependency
Amundsen Coast